The 1904 Missouri State Normal football team represented the Missouri State Normal School—Third District—now known as Southeast Missouri State University—located in Cape Girardeau, Missouri during the 1904 college football season. The team did not have a coach and outscored their opponents 22–0 en route to an undefeated season.

Schedule

References

Missouri State Normal
Southeast Missouri State Redhawks football seasons
College football undefeated seasons
Missouri State Normal football